Roy McCallum (1913–1979), nicknamed "Rooster", was a rugby league footballer who played in the 1930s and 1940s for Canterbury-Bankstown in the New South Wales Rugby League (NSWRL) competition.

Rugby league career
McCallum made his debut for Canterbury in the club's inaugural year, making five appearances in a season in which the side only managed to win one match. 

In 1938, McCallum played in the NSWRL grand final victory over Eastern Suburbs, which was the first premiership for the club.  In 1940, McCallum played for Waratah Mayfield in Newcastle.  The following year, McCallum returned to Canterbury. This time he played in reserve grade for the entire season before leaving the club once again.  

McCallum returned in 1946 and 1947 in which both times he failed to make the first grade team, playing for the reserve grade team instead before retiring from all forms of the game at the end of 1947.  McCallum's younger brothers Reub and Arthur also played for Canterbury.  McCallum died in 1979.  In 2004, McCallum was nominated for the Berries to Bulldogs 70 Year Team of Champions.

References

1913 births
Australian rugby league players
Canterbury-Bankstown Bulldogs players
1979 deaths
Rugby league players from New South Wales
Rugby league second-rows
Rugby league props